Jerzy Turonek (26 April 1929 – 2 January 2019) was a Polish-Belarusian historian. He was born in Dukszty into the family of West Belarusian political activist Bronisław Turonek in the Second Polish Republic's Wilno Voivodeship.

Biography 
After World War II, Turonek graduated from the Higher School for Planning and Statistics in Warsaw in 1952, and later worked for the Polish foreign trade chamber where he was analysing the international chemicals market and worked at the European economic commission in Geneva.

In the early 1960s, Turonek began researching the Belarusian national movement of the early 20th century, Polish-Belarusian relations in the 20th century, and the history of the Roman Catholic Church. In 1986, he became a Doctor of History. Turonek is the author of monograph Białoruś pod okupacją niemiecką (Belarus under the German occupation) published in 1993 by Książka i Wiedza. Copies of his monograph shipped to Belarus for distribution were confiscated by the KGB, the Belarusian security service.

Works
 Białoruś pod okupacją niemiecką (Belarus under German occupation, Warsaw, 1993),
 Wacław Iwanowski i odrodzenie Białorusi (Vacłaŭ Ivanoŭski and the renaissance of Belarus, Warsaw, 1992),
 Książka białoruska w II Rzeczypospolitej 1921-1939 (Belarusian book publishing in the Second Polish Republic, Warsaw, 2000),
 Беларуская кніга пад нямецкім кантролем (1939-1944) (Belarusian book publishing under German control in 1939-1944, Minsk, 2002).
 Людзі СБМ (People GMS, Belarusian Youth Union)

References

1929 births
2019 deaths
People from Dūkštas
Polish people of Belarusian descent
20th-century Polish historians
Polish male non-fiction writers
Historians of Belarus
Male non-fiction writers